Nanke may refer to:

 National Nanke International Experimental High School
 Nanke, a cadet branch of the Japanese Fujiwara family
 A place in the Chinese folktale The Governor of Nanke